This list of 2021 motorsport champions is a list of national or international motorsport series with championships decided by the points or positions earned by a driver from multiple races where the season was completed during the 2021 calendar year.

Drag racing

Motorcycle racing

Motocross

Open wheel racing

Rally

Rally raid

Rallycross

Sports car and GT

Stock car racing

Touring cars

Truck racing

References

Champions
2021